Fernando Cuéllar Reyes (born 22 September 1963) is a Mexican politician affiliated with the Party of the Democratic Revolution (PRD). He is currently Deputy for the LXII Legislature of the Mexican Congress representing the Federal District.

References

1963 births
Living people
People from Mexico City
Party of the Democratic Revolution politicians
21st-century Mexican politicians
Deputies of the LXII Legislature of Mexico
Members of the Chamber of Deputies (Mexico) for Mexico City